Each of the 31 states of Mexico and Mexico City has a separate coat of arms. Each Mexican state flag contains the respective state arms, typically on a white background.

Gallery

See also 
Coat of arms of Mexico

References 

 Coats of arms
Mexico